Barkhan (Balochi: بارکھئوں) is the capital city of the Barkhan District in the Balochistan province of Pakistan. It is located at 29°54'0N 69°31'0E at an altitude of 1,100 metres (3,612 feet).

Climate

Barkhan has a hot semi-arid climate (Köppen climate classification BSh) with very hot summers and mild winters. Precipitation mainly falls in two distinct periods: light to moderate rain in the late winter and early spring from February to April, and heavier rain in the monsoon from June to September.

References

Populated places in Balochistan, Pakistan
Barkhan District